United States v. Silk, 331 U.S. 704 (1947), was a United States Supreme Court case regarding US labor law. The case concerned the scope of protection for employees under the Social Security Act 1935.

Background 
The Commissioner of Internal Revenue sued two businesses for employment taxes, one coal loading called Albert Silk Coal Co, run by Mr Silk in Topeka, Kansas, and one trucking, Greyvan Lines, Inc. The Commissioner said the taxes were due under the Social Security Act 1935, for employees of the business. In the Silk case, unloaders of coal provided their own tools, worked only when they wished, and were paid an agreed price for each ton of coal that they unloaded from railroad cars. In the Greyvan Lines case, truck drivers owned their own trucks, paid expenses for their operations, employed their own helpers and received payment on a piecework or percentage basis. The businesses argued that the coal loaders or the truck drivers providing work were independent contractors, and so not covered by social security taxes. In both cases, the District Court and the Circuit Court of Appeals had found that the coal loaders or truckers were independent contractors. The Commissioner had appealed.

Judgment
The Supreme Court held that the coal unloaders were ‘employees’ under the Social Security Act 1935. The same principles were to be applied as under the National Labor Relations Act, as elaborated in NLRB v Hearst Publications. The truck drivers were not employees, but rather independent contractors.

Reed J gave the Court's judgment.

Black J, Douglas J and Murphy J concurred with the principles, but dissented on their application, stating they would have held the Greyvan truckers also to be employees. Rutledge J stated he would have remanded the case to the District Court to reconsider the position of the Greyvan truckers in light of the principles stated by the court.

See also 

 US labor law

References

External links
 

United States Supreme Court cases
United States Supreme Court cases of the Vinson Court
United States labor case law
Coal in the United States
Precarious work
1947 in United States case law